Parente is a surname in Italian, Spanish and Portuguese and may refer to:

Pietro Parente (1891–1986), Italian theologian and cardinal
Álvaro Parente, Portuguese racecar driver
Carol-Lynn Parente, executive producer of Sesame Street
William Parente, controversial New York real estate attorney
Nildo Parente, Brazilian actor
Teresa Parente, American actress
Paulo César Arruda Parente, Brazilian soccer player
Mario Parente, Canadian outlaw biker.
Angelo Parente, former drummer for the band Motionless In White
Alison Swan Parente, English food educator